Ramya Haridas is an Indian politician and social worker, who is serving as Member of Parliament, Lok Sabha (MP) from Alathur, Kerala, since May 2019. She is a member of the Indian National Congress (INC) party in the state of Kerala and the daughter of All India Mahila Congress worker Radha. She is the only female parliamentarian to be elected from the state of Kerala in the elections of 2019. She is also the second-ever Dalit woman MP to have been elected from Kerala.

Political career 
Ramya began her political career in 2011 when she was shortlisted in a talent hunt programme conducted by Indian National Congress under the leadership of Rahul Gandhi. She also received personal mentorship from Rahul Gandhi.

Her mother, Radha's affiliation with Kerala Mahila Congress that lead Ramya's involvement in electoral politics. She started off as being a member of the Kerala Students Union and later joined the Youth Congress. She was also associated with land rights struggles through her involvement with Ekta parishad, a people's movement working for social and land reforms related issues across the country. She is the ninth women Loksabha MP from Kerala.

Elections 2019 
When her candidature for 2019 elections was announced, she was serving as the Block Panchayat President for Kunnamangalam, Kozhikode district. She was the only Lok Sabha candidate from Kerala handpicked by Congress President Rahul Gandhi.

In the 2019 Indian general election to parliament, she won from Alathur (Lok Sabha constituency) with a margin of 1,58,968 votes against the Communist Party of India (Marxist) candidate P. K. Biju.

Amongst the 2019 cohort of ministers, Haridas happens to be one of the least wealthy politicians- her total assets valuing just Rs 22,816.

Haridas also resorted to a crowdfunding campaign to raise money for her election expenses. It was a huge success as it raised more than Rs 10 lakhs. John Samuel, a former director of United Nations Development Programme, and also someone who was involved in raising funds for Kerala Floods Relief spearheaded her fundraising campaign that was called' Ramya Haridas Challenge Fund. Shashi Tharoor also shared her campaign appeal on his Facebook page. During her election campaign in Alathur, Haridas claims she had only three sets of dresses. By the end of her campaign, she had 56 of them, all donated by her supporters.

Haridas is also a singer and she used her talent to attract voters during her election campaign. Several voters would flock to hear her sing during her campaign.

She also lodged a complaint with the police against Communist party of India (Marxist) politician A Vijayaraghavan for making a sexually loaded remark about her.

Personal life 
Ramya Haridas's father was a daily wage labourer and her mother was a tailor. She stays in a house allotted under the Indira Awas Yojana, a housing programme introduced by the Rajiv Gandhi government.

She has finished her tenth standard along with diploma courses in early childhood education and fashion design.

References

External links 
Official biographical sketch in Parliament of India website

Living people
1987 births
Indian National Congress politicians from Kerala
Women in Kerala politics
Dalit politicians
Politicians from Kozhikode
India MPs 2019–present
21st-century Indian women politicians